Bicyclus martius, the black bush brown, is a butterfly in the family Nymphalidae. It is found in Guinea, Sierra Leone, Liberia, Ivory Coast, Ghana, Togo, Nigeria, Equatorial Guinea, Cameroon, the Republic of the Congo, Angola, the Democratic Republic of the Congo, Sudan and Uganda. The habitat consists of lowland primary forests and secondary growth.

The larvae feed on Paspalum conjugatum.

Subspecies
Bicyclus martius martius (Guinea, Sierra Leone, Liberia, Ivory Coast, Ghana, Togo)
Bicyclus martius sanaos (Hewitson, 1866) (Nigeria, Bioko, Cameroon, Congo, Angola, Democratic Republic of the Congo, southern Sudan, Uganda)

References

Elymniini
Butterflies described in 1793